The 1995 Cork Senior Football Championship was the 107th staging of the Cork Senior Football Championship since its establishment by the Cork County Board in 1887. The draw for the opening round fixtures took place on 11 December 1994. The championship began on 29 April 1995 and ended on 8 October 1995.

Castlehaven were the defending champions, however, they were defeated by Beara in the second round.

On 8 October 1995, Bantry Blues won the championship following a 0-10 to 0-08 defeat of Muskerry in the final. This was their first championship title.

Mukserry's Jonathan McCarthy was the championship's top scorer with 0-24.

Team changes

To Championship

Promoted from the Cork Intermediate Football Championship
 Ballincollig

Results

First round

Second round

Quarter-finals

Semi-finals

Final

Championship statistics

Top scorers

Overall

In a single game

Championship statistics

Miscellaneous
 Bantry Blues win their first title.
 Bantry Blues qualify for the final for the first time since 1981
 Cork Regional Technical College field a team in the championship for the first time.

References

Cork Senior Football Championship